This is a list of primary and secondary schools in the South Asian island country of the Maldives. Tertiary schools are included in the separate list of universities and colleges in the Maldives.

Malé City

Upper North Province

Haa Alif Atoll

Haa Dhaalu Atoll

Haa Dhaal 
Faridhoo School
Finey School
Hdh. Atholhu Thau'leemee Markaz
Jalaaluddin School
Afeefuddin School
Ameer Ameen School
The Leading Steps - International Pre-school
Hdh. Atholhu Madhrasa
Hanimaadhoo School
Hirimaradhoo School
Jalaaluddin School
Kumundhoo School
Kunburudhoo School
Kurin'bee School
Madhrasthul Husainiyya
Makunudhoo School
Naavaidhoo School
Nellaidhoo School
Neykurendhoo School
Nolhivaram School
Nolhivaramfaru School

Shaviyani 
Sh. Atholhu Thau'leemee Markaz
Sh. Atholhu Madhrasa
Funadhoo School
Milandhoo School
Bileyffahi School
Feevaku School
Feydhoo School
Firun'baidhoo School
Foakaidhoo School
Goidhoo School
Lhaimagu School
Maakan'doodho School
Maaungoodhoo School
Narudhoo School
Noomara School

Noonu Atoll

Raa Atoll

Baa Atoll 
 Baa Atoll Education Centre(Baa. Eydhafushi)
 Kudarikilu School(Baa. Kudarikilu)
 Kendhoo School(Baa. Kendhoo)
 Kamadhoo School(Baa. Kamadhoo)
 Kihaadhoo School(Baa. Kihaadhoo)
 Dhonfanu School(Baa. Dhonfanu)
 Baa Atholhu School(Baa. Dharavandhoo)
 Maalhohu School(Baa. Maalhos)
 Hithaadhoo School(Baa. Hithaadhoo)
 Thulhaadhoo School(Baa. Thulhaadhoo)
 Goidhoo School(Baa. Goidhoo)
 Fehendhoo School(Baa. Fehendhoo)
 Fulhadhoo School(Baa. Fulhadhoo)

Lhaviyani 
 Lh.Atoll education Centre(Lh. Hinnavaru)
 Madhrasathul Ifthithaah(Lh. Naifaru)
 Lh.Atoll School(Lh. Kurendhoo)
 Habashee Pre-School(Lh. Kurendhoo)
 Lh. Olhuvelifushi School(Lh. Olhuvelifushi)

Central region

Faafu Atoll
 Faafu atholhu madharsa  (Feeali)
 Magoodhoo school  (Magoodhoo)
 Dharanboodhoo school  (Dharanboodhoo)
 Bilehdhoo school  (Bilehdhoo)
Faafu Atoll Education center (Nilandhoo)

Southern region

Gnaviyani Atoll 
 GN atoll Education Centre
 Mohammed Jamaludden School
 Hafiz Ahmed School
 Fuvamulaku School
 Ideal School
 Zikuraa Pre-school
 Maalegami Pre-school
 Bright way international school

Gaafu Dhaalu Atoll
 Gaafu Dhaalu Atoll Education Centre (Thinadhoo, Gaafu Dhaalu Atoll)
 Thinadhoo School
 Aboobakuru School
 Madaveli School
 Hoandeddhoo School
 Nadellaa School
 Rathafandhoo School
 Vaadhoo Jamaaluddin School
 Huvadhoo School  (FaresMathoda)
 Fiyoaree School
 Raw'la Preschool
 Kangaroo Preschool / Gdh.Thinadhoo

Addu City
 Seenu Atoll School (Hulhumeedhoo)
 Sharafuddin School  (Hithadhoo)
 Irshadiyya School  (Maradhoo)
 Shamsudheen School  (Hulhumeedhoo)
 Hulhudhoo School  (Hulhumeedhoo)
 Feydhoo School  (Feydhoo)
 Nooraanee School  (Hithadhoo)
 Addu High School  (Hithadhoo)
 Maradhoo school  (Maradhoo)
 Shareepee Pre school  (Hulhumeedhoo)
 Makthabul Asriyya  (Hulhumeedhoo)
 Addu Atoll Education Center (Hithadhoo)
 Maradoofeydhoo School  (Maradhoofeydhooo)
 Hithadhoo School  (Hithadhoo)
 Kudhimaa Pre School (Feydhoo)
 Aman pre-school (Maradhoo)
 Ujala pre-school  (Maradhoofeydhooo)
 Medhevalu School (Hithadhoo)
 Hiraa School (Hithadhoo)
 Kangaroo husainiyya pre school
 Mianz international school

Thaa Atoll 
 Kinbidhoo School
Thaa Atholhu Thauleemee Marukaz

See also

 Education in the Maldives
 Lists of schools

References

Schools
Maldives
Maldives
Schools

Education in the Maldives
Schools